Prepusa is a genus name that may refer to:
Prepusa (beetle), a type of ground beetle
Prepusa (plant), a genus of Brazilian plants in the Gentian family.